The 1930 Southern Conference football season was the college football games played by the member schools of the Southern Conference as part of the 1930 college football season. The season began on September 20.

In the annual Rose Bowl game, the SoCon champion Alabama Crimson Tide defeated the PCC champion Washington State 24–0 and claims a national championship. It was Wallace Wade's last year as Alabama head coach.

Tulane was also co-champion. Times-Picayune sports writer Pete Baird called the 1930 squad "the best team that ever represented the Olive and Blue".

Regular season

SoCon teams in bold.

Week One

Week Two

Week Three

Week Four

Week Five

Week Six

Week Seven

Week Eight

Week Nine

Week Ten

Week Eleven

Week Twelve

Bowl games

Awards and honors

All-Americans

E – Jerry Dalrymple, Tulane (AP-3; UP-2; COL-1; INS-2; CP-2; NANA; AAB)
E – Herb Maffett, Georgia (UP-3; NYEP-1)
E – Bill Schwartz, Vanderbilt (CP-2)
T – Fred Sington, Alabama (AP-1; UP-1; COL-1; INS-1; NEA-1; CP-1; NANA; NYEP-1; NYS-1; LAT; AAB)
T – Vance Maree, Georgia Tech (INS-3)
T – Foots Clement, Alabama (CP-3)
G – Ralph Maddox, Georgia (INS-1)
C – Lloyd Roberts, Tulane (INS-3)
QB – Bobby Dodd, Tennessee (AP-2; UP-2; COL-1; NEA-1 [hb]; CP-2)
HB – John Suther, Alabama (AP-3; UP-3; INS-2; CP-1; NYEP-1)
HB – Red Bethea, Florida (CP-2)
FB – Jack Roberts, Georgia (INS-3; CP-2)
FB – Johnny Cain, Alabama (INS-2)

All-Southern team

The following includes the composite All-Southern team of southern coaches and sports writers compiled by the Associated Press.

References